Olfactory receptor 51E2 is a protein that in humans is encoded by the OR51E2 gene.

Olfactory receptors interact with odorant molecules in the nose, to initiate a neuronal response that triggers the perception of a smell. The olfactory receptor proteins are members of a large family of G-protein-coupled receptors (GPCR) arising from single coding-exon genes. Olfactory receptors share a 7-transmembrane domain structure with many neurotransmitter and hormone receptors and are responsible for the recognition and G protein-mediated transduction of odorant signals. The olfactory receptor gene family is the largest in the genome. The nomenclature assigned to the olfactory receptor genes and proteins for this organism is independent of other organisms.

Ligands
OR51E2 is a relatively narrowly tuned olfactory receptor, meaning it responds only to a relatively small set of related odorants.

OR51E2 responds to short-chain fatty acids, including in particular propionic acid.

See also
 Olfactory receptor

References

Further reading

External links 
 

Olfactory receptors